Douglas James Dettmer  (born 1964) has been the Archdeacon of Totnes since 2015.

Dettmer was educated at the University of Kansas and ordained in 1991. After a curacy in Ilfracombe he was Domestic Chaplain to the Bishop of Exeter from 1994 to 1998. He was then Priest in charge of Thorverton and Stoke Canon until 2010 when he became Rector of Brampford Speke.

References

1964 births
University of Kansas alumni
Archdeacons of Totnes
Living people